In the history of the Southern United States, the Antebellum Period (from ) spanned the end of the War of 1812 to the start of the American Civil War in 1861. The Antebellum South was characterized by the use of slavery and the culture it fostered. As the era proceeded, Southern intellectuals and leaders gradually shifted from portraying slavery as an embarrassing and temporary system, to a defense of slavery as a positive good, and harshly criticized the nascent abolitionist movement. 

The economy was largely plantation based, and dependent on exports. Society was stratified, inegalitarian, and perceived by immigrants as lacking in opportunities. Consequently the manufacturing base lagged behind the non-slave states. Wealth inequality grew as the larger landholders took the greater share of the profits generated by slaves, which also helped to entrench their power as a political class.  

As the country expanded westward, slavery's propagation became a major issue in national politics, eventually boiling over into the Civil War. In the years that followed, this period was romanticized by historical revisionists to protect three central assertions: that the Confederate cause was heroic, that enslaved people were happy and satisfied, and that slavery was not the primary cause of the war. This phenomenon has continued to influence racism, gender roles, and religious attitudes in the South, and to a lesser extent the rest of the country, to the present day.

History 
In the 18th century, the Atlantic slave trade brought enslaved Africans to the South during the colonial period as a source of labor for the harvesting of crops. There were almost 700,000 enslaved persons in the U.S. in 1790, which equated to approximately 18 percent of the total population, or roughly one in every six people. This would persist through the 17th and 18th centuries, but it was not until the invention of the cotton gin by Eli Whitney in the 1790s, that slavery grew very profitable and that the large plantation system developed. In the 15 years between the invention of the cotton gin and the passage of the Act Prohibiting Importation of Slaves, an increase in the slave trade occurred, furthering the slave system in the United States.

Economic structure 
The Antebellum South saw large expansions in agriculture, while manufacturing growth remained relatively slow. The Southern economy was characterized by a low level of capital accumulation (largely slave-labor-based) and a shortage of liquid capital, which, when aggravated by the need to concentrate on a few staples, the pervasive anti-industrial and anti-urban ideology, and the reduction of Southern banking, led to a South dependent on export trade. In contrast to the economies of the Northern and Western U.S., which relied primarily on their own domestic markets. Since the Southern domestic market consisted primarily of plantations, Southern states imported sustenance commodities from the West, and manufactured goods from the North.

The plantation system can be seen as the factory system applied to agriculture, with a concentration of labor under skilled management. But while the industrial manufacturing-based labor economy of the North was driven by growing demand, maintenance of the plantation economic system depended upon usage of slave labor that was both abundant and cheap.

The five major commodities of the Southern agricultural economy were cotton, grain, tobacco, sugar, and rice, with the production of the leading cash crop, cotton, which were concentrated in the Deep South (Mississippi, Alabama, and Louisiana).

Inefficiency of slave-based agriculture 

The leading historian of the era was Ulrich Bonnell Phillips, who studied slavery not so much as a political issue between North and South, but as a social and economic system. He focused on the large plantations that dominated the South.

Phillips addressed the unprofitability of slave labor and slavery's ill effects on the Southern economy. An example of pioneering comparative work was "A Jamaica Slave Plantation" (1914). His methods inspired the "Phillips school" of slavery studies, between 1900 and 1950.

Phillips argued that large-scale plantation slavery was inefficient and not progressive. It had reached its geographical limits by 1860 or so, and therefore eventually had to fade away (as happened in Brazil). In 1910, he argued in "The Decadence of the Plantation System" that slavery was an unprofitable relic that persisted because it produced social status, honor, and political power. "Most farmers in the South had small-to-medium-sized farms with few slaves, but the large plantation owner's wealth, often reflected in the number of slaves they owned, afforded them considerable prestige and political power."

Phillips contended that masters treated enslaved persons relatively well; his views on that issue were later sharply rejected by Kenneth M. Stampp. His conclusions about the economic decline of slavery were challenged in 1958 by Alfred H. Conrad and John R. Meyer in a landmark study published in the Journal of Political Economy. Their arguments were further developed by Robert Fogel and Stanley L. Engerman, who argued in their 1974 book, Time on the Cross, that slavery was both efficient and profitable, as long as the price of cotton was high enough. In turn, Fogel and Engerman came under attack from other historians of slavery.

Effects of economy on social structure 
As slavery began to displace indentured servitude as the principal supply of labor in the plantation systems of the South, the economic nature of the institution of slavery aided in the increased inequality of wealth seen in the antebellum South. The demand for slave labor and the U.S. ban on importing more slaves from Africa drove up prices for slaves, making it profitable for smaller farmers in older settled areas such as Virginia to sell their slaves further south and west. The actuarial risk, or the potential loss in investment of owning slaves from death, disability, etc. was much greater for small plantation owners. Accentuated by the rise in price of slaves seen just prior to the Civil War, the overall costs associated with owning slaves to the individual plantation owner led to the concentration of slave ownership seen at the eve of the Civil War.

Social structure 
Much of the Antebellum South was rural, and in line with the plantation system, largely agricultural. With the exception of New Orleans and Baltimore, the slave states had no large cities, and the urban population of the South could not compare to that of the Northeast, or even that of the agrarian West. This led to a sharp division in class in the southern states, between the landowning "master" class, yeoman farmers, poor whites, and slaves; while in the northern and western states, much of the social spectrum was dominated by a wide range of different laboring classes.

Wealth inequality 
The conclusion that, while both the North and the South were characterized by a high degree of inequality during the plantation era, the wealth distribution was much more unequal in the South than in the North arises from studies concerned with the equality of land, slave, and wealth distribution. For example, in certain states and counties, due to the concentration of landholding and slave holding, which were highly correlated, six percent of landowners ended up commanding one-third of the gross income and an even higher portion of the net income. The majority of landowners, who had smaller scale plantations, saw a disproportionately small portion in revenues generated by the slavery-driven plantation system.

Effects of social structure on economy 
While the two largest classes in the South included land- and slave-owners and slaves, various strata of social classes existed within and between the two. In examining class relations and the banking system in the South, the economic exploitation of slave labor can be seen to arise from a need to maintain certain conditions for the existence of slavery and from a need for each of the remaining social strata to remain in status quo. In order to meet conditions where slavery may continue to exist, members of the master class (e.g. white, landowning, slave-owning) had to compete with other members of the master class to maximize the surplus labor extracted from slaves. Likewise, in order to remain within the same class, members of the master class (and each subsumed class below) must expand their claim on revenues derived from the slave labor surplus.

Mercantilist underpinnings
Mercantilist ideologies largely explain the rise of the plantation system in the United States. In the 16th and 17th centuries under mercantilism, rulers of nations believed that the accumulation of wealth through a favorable balance of trade was the best way to ensure power. As a result, several European nations began to colonize the Americas to take advantage of rich natural resources and encourage exports.

One example of England utilizing the American colonies for economic gain was tobacco. When tobacco was first discovered as a recreational substance, there was a widespread social backlash in England, spearheaded by King James I himself. By the middle of the 17th century, however, Parliament had realized the revenue potential of tobacco and quickly changed its official moral stance towards its use. As a result, tobacco plantations sprung up across the American South in large numbers to support European demand. By 1670, more than half of all tobacco shipped to England was being re-exported to other countries throughout Europe at a premium. In similar ways Britain was able to profit from other American staple crops, such as cotton, rice, and indigo. As Russell Menard puts it, Britain's capitalizing on increased European demand for these crops "fueled the expansion of the American plantation colonies, transformed the Atlantic into an English inland sea, and led to the creation of the first British Empire."

Many claim that being a part of the British mercantilist system was in the best economic interest of the American colonies as well, as they would not have been able to survive as independent economic entities. Robert Haywood, in his article "Mercantilism and South Carolina Agriculture, 1700–1763", argues that "it was unthinkable that any trade could prosper in the straight-jacket of regimented and restricted international trade, without the guiding hand of a powerful protecting government."

Adverse economic effects
The plantation era, while a part of the South's initial economic prosperity, was also the reason why the South lagged in productivity starting in the early-to-mid-19th century. Since the plantation system mainly required a large volume of unskilled labor, the South did not have the human capital to succeed when the plantation era was over. Ulrich Bonnell Phillips contends that the plantation "sadly restricted the opportunity of such men as were of better industrial quality than was required for the field gangs." Essentially, men who would have been otherwise capable of performing other skilled jobs were nonetheless relegated to field work because of the nature of the system.

A 1984 journal article by Claudia Goldin and Kenneth Sokoloff suggested that the South misallocated labor compared to the North, which more eagerly embraced women and child labor in its factories to push forward industrialization due to their relative value to Northern agriculture being lesser than in Southern agriculture.

While the South still attracted immigrants from Europe, the North attracted far more during the early-to-mid 1800s, such that by the time of the American Civil War, the population of the North far exceeded the non-enslaved population of the South per the 1860 United States census. Colin Woodard argued in his 2011 book American Nations that the South was relatively less successful in attracting immigrants due to the South's reputation as a more stratified society. Striving immigrants who sought economic advancement thus tended to favor the more egalitarian North, compared to the more aristocratic South, where there were fewer perceived opportunities for advancement.

See also
 
 Confederate States of America
 Reconstruction era
 Deep South
 Old South, the pre-Civil War economy and society of the Southern U.S.
 New South, the post-Reconstruction era economy and society of the Southern U.S.

References

 
Economic history of the American Civil War
Eras of United States history
American frontier
Jeffersonian democracy
Historical regions in the United States
19th century in the United States
Plantations in the United States
History of the Southern United States